The Morgenblatt für gebildete Stände ("Morning paper for the educated classes", renamed to Morgenblatt für gebildete Leser, "Morning paper for educated readers" in 1837) was a German cultural and literary journal that existed from 1807 to 1865. It appeared daily (Monday to Saturday) until 1851, when it was changed to a weekly journal. The  was published by Cotta in Tübingen and later in Stuttgart, and was the most important German literary and cultural journal of its time.

Conception and history 

The decision to use the name  (morning paper) was decided in November 1806.

The journal was not tied to any literary trends or programmes, but tried to cover the entire breadth of literary production. It covered a wide range of cultural topics including travelogues and literary criticism. The intended audience was an educated, but not scholarly, cultural elite, explicitly including women.

It was quite successful both with critics and with the general public. The circulation increased to 1810 copies by 1819, but the journal had many more readers via subscription libraries or other reading clubs, and its total readership has been estimated around 15,000. The journal appeared daily (Monday to Friday) until 1851, then weekly until 1865.

Others included Heinrich von Kleist, Johann Gottfried Seume, Eduard Mörike, Theodor Fontane and Conrad Ferdinand Meyer. To discover more authors, the journal also used competitions, starting with one in 1807 where Goethe was a judge.

The journal was published in Tübingen until 1820, in Stuttgart and Tübingen until 1855, when it was published in Stuttgart and Augsburg for a short time, and then in Stuttgart and Munich until the end.

When the long-term editor  died in 1865, the journal was discontinued at the end of the year, with readers preferring other products like .

Editors 

Both quit after disagreements with Cotta. After criticism by Karl Böttiger, Cotta replaced Weisser by Friedrich Rückert, who was an editor 1815-1817.

Huber was the first woman supporting her family with a salaried editorial position at a journal and has been described as the first woman to hold an editorial position and even as the first journalist in Germany. Huber had full responsibility for the journal from 1817, when Rückert and Haug quit, to 1823. She was not only author and editor for the journal, but also contributed many of her own translations. The journal had its most successful period under her editorship, with more than 1800 copies sold in 1820, and somewhat declined after she left, but this decline has also been attributed to problems with censorship related to the Carlsbad Decrees.

In 1823, Cotta installed his son  as assistant editor and announced the move of the  editorial office to Augsburg, and Huber moved there. However, Cotta eventually decided to leave the offices in Stuttgart (possibly for reasons of censorship) and Huber's editorial duties came to an end. The editorship was then taken over by Cotta himself and his son, but this was not publicly announced.
The brothers Wilhelm Hauff and, after his early death, Hermann Hauff became the editors from 1 January 1827.

According to some reports, he used it extensively for self-promotion of his dramas. From 1825, it was edited by Wolfgang Menzel who used his influence to advance national liberalism and to attack more liberal intellectuals.

Selected contents and contributors 
Goethe, whose works were published by Cotta, was regularly featured and also contributed some content, for example an essay about a new edition of his works.

Friedrich Engels contributed as the correspondent for Bremen in 1840-1841.

Ottilie Assing wrote for the journal both before and after her emigration to the United States, and her interpretation in more than 130 reports was highly influential on the views of the German intellectual public on the problem of slavery in 1860s America. With the list of authors also including Caroline Pichler, Annette von Droste-Hülshoff, Friederike Brun and others, almost all notable female writers of the time were featured in the journal.

References

Bibliography

External links

1807 establishments in Germany
Defunct literary magazines published in Germany
Magazines established in 1807
Magazines disestablished in 1865
Magazines published in Stuttgart
Mass media in Tübingen
Weekly magazines published in Germany
1865 disestablishments in Europe